Abry Jones (born September 8, 1991) is a former American football nose tackle. He was signed as an undrafted free agent by the Jacksonville Jaguars after the 2013 NFL Draft. He played college football at Georgia.

Professional career

Jacksonville Jaguars
Following the 2013 NFL Draft, Jones was signed by the Jacksonville Jaguars as an undrafted free agent. He made the team's 53-man roster on August 30, 2013. Jones made his NFL debut on October 6, 2013, against the St. Louis Rams. On October 20, 2013, Jones made his first career tackle against the San Diego Chargers. On December 22, 2013, Jones recorded his first career sack and a season high four tackles against the Tennessee Titans.

On October 5, 2014, Jones recorded a career-high two sacks including his first career forced fumble against the Pittsburgh Steelers. On December 18, 2014, Jones made his first career start and recorded a career high five tackles against the Tennessee Titans. In the 2014 season at the time, Jones recorded a career-best 39 tackles, three sacks, four tackles for loss, and one forced fumble.

On October 4, 2015, Jones recorded his first career fumble recovery against the Indianapolis Colts. On January 1, 2016, Jones was placed on injured reserve.

On February 15, 2017, Jones signed a four-year, $16 million contract extension with the Jaguars. On September 10, 2017, in the season opener against the Houston Texans, Jones's teammate Yannick Ngakoue forced a fumble off of quarterback Tom Savage. The fumble was recovered by Jones and set the Jaguars' offense up for a touchdown scoring drive.

On October 22, 2020, Jones was placed on injured reserve with an ankle injury. He was designated to return from injured reserve on November 25, and began practicing with the team again, but the team did not activate him before his practice period expired on December 16.

Tennessee Titans
On June 3, 2021, Jones signed with the Tennessee Titans. He announced his retirement from the NFL on July 24, 2021.

References

External links
Jacksonville Jaguars bio
Georgia Bulldogs bio

1991 births
Living people
People from Warner Robins, Georgia
Players of American football from Georgia (U.S. state)
American football defensive ends
American football defensive tackles
Georgia Bulldogs football players
Jacksonville Jaguars players
Tennessee Titans players